Jacqueline West (born December 29, 1979) is an American writer of children's fiction and poet. Her poetry has been nominated for the Pushcart Prize and her Books of Elsewhere fantasy series has appeared on the New York Times Best Seller list.

Early life and education
Jacqueline West was born in Red Wing, Minnesota, but was raised in River Falls, Wisconsin, where she graduated from River Falls High School in 1998. She received a degree from the University of Wisconsin-Eau Claire, and has studied at the University of Wisconsin-Madison and Edgewood College. She currently resides in Red Wing, Minnesota.

Career
West is the author of The Books of Elsewhere, a children's literature series published by Dial Books for Young Readers, a division of Penguin Group USA. Beyond work with fiction, West also publishes poetry. Her chapbook of poetry about Czech immigrants to western Minnesota, Cherma, was published by the University of Wisconsin's Parallel Press in March, 2010. Additionally, she has been an arts and theater reviewer for Isthmus, a newspaper in Madison, Wisconsin. She was nominated for the Pushcart Prize for Poetry twice. 

In 2008, she won the Dorothy Sargent Rosenberg prize for poetry, and she was a finalist for the Minnesota Book Awards in 2011, 2012, 2019, and 2022. 
Her book The Shadows was a finalist for the 2011-2012 Texas Bluebonnet Award, the 2013 Louisiana Young Readers' Choice Awards (Grades 3 - 5), and the 2013 Illinois Bluestem Award.

West was the winner of the 2022 Minnesota Book Award for Middle Grade Literature for her 2021 book Long Lost.

Works
Cherma (Parallel Press, March 2010),  
 Dreamers Often Lie (Dial Books, April 5, 2016), 

, Illustrated by Hatem Aly

The Books of Elsewhere
, illustrated by Poly Bernatene

Still Life: The Books of Elsewhere, Penguin, 2014, 

The Collectors

References

External links

 
 
 

1979 births
Living people
American children's writers
American fantasy writers
People from Red Wing, Minnesota
People from River Falls, Wisconsin
University of Wisconsin–Eau Claire alumni
Novelists from Minnesota
Novelists from Wisconsin
American women novelists
Women science fiction and fantasy writers
21st-century American women writers